The Merthyr Rising, also referred to as the Merthyr Riots, of 1831 was the violent climax to many years of simmering unrest among the large working class population of Merthyr Tydfil in Wales and the surrounding area. The Rising marked the first times the red flag was used a symbol of working class rebellion in the United Kingdom.

Beginnings
Throughout May 1831 the coal miners and others who worked for William Crawshay took to the streets of Merthyr Tydfil, calling for reform, protesting against the lowering of their wages and general unemployment. Gradually the protest spread to nearby industrial towns and villages and by the end of May the whole area was in rebellion, and it is believed that for the first time the red flag of revolution was flown as a symbol of workers' revolt.

Events
After storming Merthyr town, the rebels sacked the local debtors' court and the goods that had been collected. Account books containing debtors' details were also destroyed. Among the shouts were cries of Caws a bara (cheese and bread) and I lawr â'r Brenin (down with the king).

On 1 June 1831, the protesters marched to local mines and persuaded the men on shift there to stop working and join their protest. In the meantime, the British government in London had ordered in the army, with contingents of the 93rd (Sutherland Highlanders) Regiment of Foot dispatched to Merthyr Tydfil to restore order. Since the crowd was now too large to be dispersed, the soldiers were ordered to protect essential buildings and people.

On 2 June, while local employers and magistrates were holding a meeting with the High Sheriff of Glamorgan at the Castle Inn, a group led by Lewis Lewis (known as Lewsyn yr Heliwr) marched there to demand a reduction in the price of bread and an increase in their wages. The demands were rejected, and after being advised to return to their homes, attacked the inn. Engaged by the 93rd (Sutherland Highlanders) Regiment of Foot, after the rioters seized some of their weapons, the troops were commanded to open fire. After a protracted struggle in which hundreds sustained injury, some fatal, the Highlanders were compelled to withdraw to Penydarren House, and abandon the town to the rioters.

Some 7,000 to 10,000 workers marched under a red flag, which was later adopted internationally as the symbol of communists and socialists. For four days, magistrates and ironmasters were under siege in the Castle Hotel, and the protesters effectively controlled Merthyr.

For eight days, Penydarren House was the sole refuge of authority. With armed insurrection fully in place in the town by 4 June, the rioters had commandeered arms and explosives, set up road-blocks, formed guerrilla detachments, and had banners capped with a symbolic loaf and dyed in blood. Those who had military experience had taken the lead in drilling the armed para-military formation, and created an effective central command and communication system.

This allowed them to control the town and engage the formal military system, including:
Ambushing the 93rd's baggage-train on the Brecon Road, under escort of forty of the Glamorgan Yeomanry, and drove them into the Brecon hills.
Beating off a relief force of a hundred cavalry sent from Penydarren House.
Ambushing and disarming the Swansea Yeomanry on the Swansea Road, and throwing them back in disorder to Neath.
Organising a mass demonstration against Penydarren House.

Having sent messengers, who had started strikes in Northern Monmouthshire, Neath and Swansea Valleys, the riots reached their peak. However, panic had spread to the family oriented and peaceful town folk, who had now started to flee what was an out-of- control town. With the rioters arranging a mass meeting for Sunday 6th, the government representatives in Penydarren House managed to split the rioters' council. When 450 troops marched to the mass meeting at Waun above Dowlais with levelled weapons, the meeting dispersed and the riots were effectively over.

Outcome

By 7 June the authorities had regained control of the town through force with up to 24 of the protesters killed. Twenty-six people were arrested and put on trial for taking part in the revolt. Several were sentenced to terms of imprisonment, others sentenced to penal transportation to Australia, and two were sentenced to death by hanging – Lewis Lewis (Lewsyn yr Heliwr) for Robbery and Richard Lewis (Dic Penderyn) for stabbing a soldier (Private Donald Black of the Highland Regiment) in the leg with a seized bayonet.

Lewsyn yr Heliwr's sentence was downgraded to a life sentence and penal transportation to Australia when one of the police officers who had tried to disperse the crowd testified that he had tried to shield him from the rioters.  He was transported aboard the vessel John in 1832 and died 6 September 1847 in Port Macquarie, New South Wales.

Following this reprieve the British government, led by Charles Grey, 2nd Earl Grey, was determined that at least one rebel should die as an example of what happened to rebels. The people of Merthyr Tydfil were convinced that Richard Lewis (Dic Penderyn) was not responsible for the stabbing, and 11,000 signed a petition demanding his release. The government refused, and Richard Lewis was hanged at Cardiff Market on August 13, 1831.

In 1874, a Congregational minister, the Rev. Evan Evans, said that a man called Ianto Parker had given him a death-bed confession, saying that he had stabbed Donald Black and then fled to America fearing capture by the authorities. James Abbott, a hairdresser from Merthyr Tydfil who had testified at Penderyn's trial, later said that he had lied under oath, claiming that he had been instructed to do so by Lord Melbourne.

Legacy 
In 2015, Welsh Labour MP Ann Clwyd presented a petition to the House of Commons calling for Dic Penderyn to be posthumously pardoned, stating that there was "strong feeling in Wales that Richard Lewis - Dic Penderyn - was wrongly executed."

In creative works 
Since 2013, a music festival named after the rising has been held annually in Merthyr to promote working class culture and social justice in arts.

Meic Stevens' song "Dic Penderyn" on his 1972 album  celebrates Richard Lewis. Radical singer-songwriter David Rovics included a song about the Merthyr Rising, entitled "Cheese and Bread", in the 2018 album Ballad of a Wobbly. The musical "My Land's Shore" by Robert Gould and Christopher J Orton centres on the riots. It was performed at the Bloomsbury Theatre by the University College London Musical Theatre society in February 2022.

In 2015, stylist Charlotte James and photographer Tom Johnson published a series titled Merthyr Rising, showcasing residents of the town.

See also
 List of riots
 Trade unions in the United Kingdom
 List of massacres in Great Britain

References

External links
Old Merthyr Tydfil: Dic Penderyn and the Merthyr Rising - Historical Photographs and Information Relating to the Merthyr Rising.

1831 in Wales
1831 riots
Food riots
Coal in Wales
Riots and civil disorder in Wales
Working class in the United Kingdom